This is a list of wars involving the Islamic Republic of Iran and its predecessor states. It is an unfinished historical overview.

See also
 History of Iran
 Cyrus in Babylon and the Jewish connection
 Persian Corridor (a.k.a. Anglo-Soviet invasion of Iran)
 Consolidation of the Iranian Revolution (1979–1982/83)

Notes

External links
 BBC WW2 People's War – Persia Invaded
 The Document Collection on the 1945–46 Iranian Crisis at the Cold War International History Project
 Dr. Mohammad Mosaddeq: Symbol of Iranian Nationalism and Struggle Against Imperialism by the Iran Chamber Society
 GlobalSecurity.org

 
Iran
Wars
Wars